Juho Haveri (31 August 1876, Vimpeli – 28 April 1961) was a Finnish schoolteacher and politician. He was a member of the Parliament of Finland from 1907 to 1908 and again from 1909 to 1910, representing the Young Finnish Party.

References

1876 births
1961 deaths
People from Vimpeli
People from Vaasa Province (Grand Duchy of Finland)
Young Finnish Party politicians
Members of the Parliament of Finland (1907–08)
Members of the Parliament of Finland (1909–10)
Finnish schoolteachers